The 2021–22 season is Sheffield Wednesday's first season in League One since the 2011–12 season, following their relegation from the Championship. The season covers the period from 1 July 2021 to 30 June 2022.

Season overview

July
On 6 July 2021, the club published their annual accounts for the year ending 31 July 2020.

On 9 July, the club were hit with a suspended 6 point penalty, which will take effect if they fail to pay their players wages on time before June 30 2022. If the penalty hasn’t been breached before 31 December 2021, the penalty would be reduced to a suspended 3 points.

On 14 July, the club introduced their new first team scholars for the 2021/22; Pierce Charles, Jack Hall, Kamil Maciag, Tafadzwa Tapudzai, Cian Flannery, Bailey-Tye Cadamarteri, Josh Chapman, Danai Rhule, Rio Shipston, Mackenzie Maltby, Sean Fusire, Joey Phuthi and Jake Bradford.

On 20 July, manager Darren Moore confirmed that first-team coach Paul Williams had left the club due to personal reasons.

On 23 July, the club unveiled their new kits for the 2021-22 season.

On 31 July, the club announced their first-team squad numbers for the 2021-22 season.

August
On 6 August, Darren Moore bolstered his coaching staff with the appointment of Simon Ireland as a first team coach.

On 7 August, Darren Moore said that his old assistant manager Wayne Jacobs was currently helping out at the club in a coaching capacity, but it was not an appointment.

On 13 August, Guiseley announced a loan move for goalkeeper Luke Jackson, but the deal would be cancelled the same day due to the keeper picking up an injury.

On 27 August, the game against Sunderland was postponed due to the Black Cats having hit the criteria for players on international duty.

October
On 8 October, Darren Moore confirmed that the club had appointed Rob Lee to his backroom staff.

November
On 2 November, Darren Moore confirmed that Nathaniel Mendez-Laing was currently training with the squad.

December
On 16 December, their upcoming game against Accrington Stanley was postponed due to an outbreak of COVID-19 at the club.

On 22 December, their boxing day tie against Burton Albion was also postponed due to a COVID-19 outbreak both teams squads.

January
On 7 January, U23 coach Lee Bullen was appointed manager of Scottish Championship side Ayr United.

On 13 January, Neil Thompson was appointed the new manager of the U23 side.

February
On 1 February, Darren Moore was absent from the game against Morecambe after testing positive for COVID-19.

On 16 February, the rearranged match against Accrington Stanley was postponed due to a waterlogged pitch.

On 21 February, their match against Fleetwood Town was postponed following storm damage.

March
On 3 March, Darren Moore confirmed that Wayne Jacobs had joined the club as an assistant manager.

April
On 4 April, Barry Bannan was awarded the Owls’ Community Player of the Year award.

On 8 April, the club announced BLU Steel energy drinks as a new back of shirt sponsor.

On 20 April, Liam Palmer was awarded the Wise Old Owls Player of the Season award.

May
On 3 May, the club published its annual accounts for the year ending July 2021.

Pre-season
As of 27 May, Wednesday announced one pre-season friendly against Celtic. On 2 July 2021, the remainder of their pre-season was announced, with games against, Chester, Alfreton Town, Barnsley, West Bromwich Albion, Wrexham and Port Vale all confirmed. On 16 July, they announced two more friendlies for a Sheffield Wednesday XI side against, Ossett United and Stocksbridge Park Steels.

Competitions

League One

League table

Results summary

Results by matchday

Matches
On Thursday, 24 June 2021, the EFL League One fixtures were revealed.

Play-offs

Sheffield Wednesday finished 4th in the regular 2021–22 EFL League One season, so were drawn against 5th placed Sunderland in the Play-off Semi Final. The first leg took place at the Stadium of Light and the second leg took place at Hillsborough.

FA Cup

Sheffield Wednesday were drawn at home to Plymouth Argyle in the first round. Either Sheffield Wednesday or Plymouth were drawn against Rochdale or Notts County in the second round draw, made on 8 November.

EFL Cup

The first round draw was made on 24 June, live on Sky Sports, by Andy Cole and Danny Mills.

EFL Trophy

Sheffield Wednesday were drawn into Northern Group H alongside Harrogate Town, Mansfield Town and Newcastle United U21. They were drawn against Hartlepool United in the second round.

Transfers and contracts

Transfers in

Transfers out

Loans in

Loans out

New contracts

Squad statistics

Appearances

|-
|colspan="12" style="text-align:center;" |No longer at the club

|}

Goalscorers

Includes all competitive matches.

Disciplinary record

Clean sheets

Awards

Club Player of the Month
Player of the Month awards for the 2021–22 season.

Club Player of the Season

Sky Bet League One Player of the Month

Sky Bet League One Manager of the Month

Sky Bet League One Player of the Season

EFL Goal of the Season

References

Sheffield Wednesday
Sheffield Wednesday F.C. seasons